Armchair cricket is a card game that is inspired by the bat and ball sport cricket.  It is played by either two or four people.  Depending on the version of the game being played, a game can last a few minutes to several hours. It was produced commercially in England but is no longer made (although unused sets are still available for sale by private and specialist traders).

The cards

The game is not played with a standard deck of playing cards.  Two identical decks of 55 cards, comprising five suits of 11, are used instead (the 110 cards together are referred to as a pack).  The suits are named after important pieces of cricketing equipment – bats, balls, stumps, gloves and pads – and numbered simply 1 to 11.  The cards numbered 1 are called ‘dollies’ (cricketing slang for an easy catch) and those numbered 11 are called ‘beauts’ (referring to excellent deliveries or shots).

Basic gameplay

In the two player game, both players hold six cards, unseen by their opponent (one player may hold seven or eight cards as a way of evening up the odds where there is a wide difference in ability).  One player will be ‘bowling’ and the other ‘batting’.  The bowler plays a card – corresponding to bowling a delivery – and the batsman responds by playing a card – corresponding to playing a shot.  Depending on the cards, the outcome may be runs for the batsman or a wicket to the bowler (or, of course, a dot ball).

Different versions

There are a number of versions of the game, which allow for games of varying length and intensity to be played.

Quicket
This is a fast, simple version, which might be thought of as an equivalent to French cricket.  Only four of the five suits are used, and once the pack has been exhausted an innings is over (since there are 88 cards in this pack and a delivery requires a card to be played by both players, the maximum length of a Quicket innings is 44 balls).  The standard way to play this version is for the innings to end immediately if a wicket falls.

Limited overs
Just as in cricket, with one innings per team, innings ending with the fall of ten wickets or after the allotted overs have been bowled.  When a pack is exhausted, the cards that have been played (the discard pile) are turned face down, shuffled and reused.

Full cricket
Each team has two innings, with scores aggregated to determine the victor.  Instead of the match length being determined by counting overs, it is done by counting how often packs are exhausted – players can think of a pack as representing half an hour of play.  So, for instance, playing a five-day Test match involves 30 ‘hours’ of play, and so the pack needs to be exhausted 60 times.

Rules

When the batsman is faced with a delivery, he or she will be out by playing a card that is different in suit and lower in value.  To score runs he or she needs to play a card that is in the same suit and higher in value.  (Anything else is a dot ball.)   The number of runs is determined by the difference in value.  Roughly, if the batsman's card exceeds the bowler's by 1, 2 or 3, one run is scored; if by 4 or 5, two runs; if by 6, three runs; if by 7, 8, 9, four runs; if by 10, six runs.  (So the only way to score a six is to play a beaut on a dolly.)  There are some complications if other rules are being played, especially the two-card shot.

The manufacturer says that with this basic rule, a game can be played but the scores will be unrealistically low (compared to real cricket).  There are a number of rules, which are best introduced gradually, which make the game more and more realistic (and require more sophisticated thinking from the players).

The most important are the no-ball rule, the extras, lower-order batsmen and the two-card shot.

No-ball rule
Playing the basic rule only soon reveals that bowling is too easy (or batting is too difficult).  The no-ball rule redresses this by reducing the number of cards that the bowler is allowed to use.  Every over there is a no-ball suit, determined by the suit used by the bowler in the last delivery of the previous over.  If a bowler plays a card in the no-ball suit then the batsman automatically gets a run, and is entitled to play any card without penalty.  The bowler has to bowl an extra delivery.  In fact, armchair cricket played simply with the no-ball rule is a challenging game and reasonable simulation of cricket already.

The extras
These are more restrictions on the bowler.  If the bowler bowls a card equal in value to the last card played then a wide is called, runs added to the batsman and the ball has to be bowled again.  If, instead, the bowler's card exceeds the last card played by one, then byes are called (the number of byes or wides depends on the value of the bowler's card).  The other extra from real cricket, the leg bye, is a feature of the two card shot.

Lower-order batsmen
To simulate the fact that in real cricket some batsmen are worse than others, there are restrictions on the cards the batsman is allowed to use when the lower order batsmen are in play.  Specifically, there are no extra restrictions on the first five batsmen, then the next three are not allowed to use dollies to defend a higher card in the same suit, and the last three batsmen cannot use dollies or twos to defend higher cards.  There is no similar way of simulating different bowlers’ abilities.

The two-card shot
This is a relatively complicated procedure, whereby the batsman plays two cards in response to the bowler's delivery, and forces the bowler to play another card, called the fielding card.  With the two-card shot rule in place, armchair cricket can simulate several more features of the real game, including run outs, overthrows, out obstructing the field, out hit the ball twice and scrambled singles (called suicide singles).

Four player games

There are some differences in the four player game, where players play in pairs.  The major differences are that for the batting side, each player holds seven cards not six, and represents one of the batsmen for the duration of that batsman's innings, whereas the two players on the bowling side always alternate overs.  So in the course of one over a bowler may well bowl to both his or her opponents.

Keeping score

Because of the game's attempt to simulate real cricket so closely, players tend to keep score in much the same way as real cricket scorers do, performing the so-called ball by ball analysis onto a specially prepared scoring pad.  In this way, individual batsmen's and bowler's performances can be given (e.g. scoring rate, number of runs conceded etc.).  However, this is not vital for determining the result of the game.  The bare minimum is to know how many balls have been bowled in the over, how far the game has progressed (in terms of overs or packs), the team's score, and which individual batsman is facing any particular delivery (if players are playing the lower-order batsmen rule).  In the Quicket version, all that's needed is to keep track of the team's score, and (as suggested in the game's documentation) players can use the unused suit to display the score.

Skill and luck

Although there is an element of luck in a game where you pick up cards face down from a shuffled deck, armchair cricket is a game of skill, and it is interesting to consider to what extent real cricketing knowledge and experience is useful in playing the game.  Perhaps experience in how to pace an innings, especially in the limited overs version, is a relevant skill.  The right time to make a declaration in the two innings version may be another example.

Realism

Bearing in mind the complicated nature of real cricket, in its technical details, armchair cricket does a remarkable job of simulating the game.  There are many details which can be ignored by the players without affecting the game, or instead savoured by cricket fans who enjoy these details.  For example, the precise values of the cards played allow players to distinguish between dot balls that are (i) defensive shots where the bat struck the ball, (ii) ‘leaves’ where the batsman deliberately does not strike the ball, and (iii) instances where the ball has ‘beaten the bat’ without taking a wicket.  Whichever of these three possibilities is the case makes no substantial difference to the game, but the detail is there nevertheless for those who wish to know.  Similarly, when a wicket falls there is a procedure for determining how the batsman was out (deciding between bowled, LBW, caught out etc.), but ultimately, the nature of the dismissal is irrelevant to the outcome of the game.

Factors that are not simulated

There are, of course, some aspects of the real game of cricket which are not simulated in armchair cricket, which players may like to think about how to incorporate into their house rules.

Weather
Rain does not stop play in armchair cricket, nor will umpires offer the batting team bad light.

Pitch conditions
Perhaps the most serious missing aspect is there is no simulation of pitch conditions.  The rule book describes the act of looking at your cards at the start of the game after winning the toss as 'inspecting the pitch’, but unless you get to see your opponent's hand as well, this is not that realistic.  The most serious drawback is that in a long two innings game, where traditionally the team batting last suffers on a deteriorating pitch, there is no real reason why in armchair cricket the fourth innings is any harder for the batting team than the previous three.  Perhaps you could adapt the lower-order batsmen rule to make it harder in the latter stages of a game?

Bowler styles
In real cricket, the bowler styles are varied and important, but there is no appreciable difference in the card game between a fast bowler, a wristy leg-spinner or a swing-and-seam merchant.  (There is a very minor differentiation, which is that when a bowler takes a wicket that is caught behind, the bowler can decide it was a stumping if the bowler was a spinner.)  This all ties up with earlier problems regarding weather and pitch conditions.  One can imagine a complicated refinement to the rules where fast bowlers on bouncy pitches in sunny weather have the odds stacked slightly in their favour, or spinners have an advantage when bowling to left-handers in the fifth day of a test, but it would need a lot of playtesting and perhaps would not add much to the game.

Setting the field
An important role played by the captain of the fielding side in cricket is deciding where each of your teammates should stand - this affects the bowler's behaviour, how easy it is for the batsman to score runs, how risky certain shots are etc.  There is no way of simulating this in armchair cricket, except to say that it falls under the general concept of how aggressively the bowler is bowling.

Fatigue
Similarly to how the pitch does not deteriorate in armchair cricket, bowlers do not get tired.  Nothing stops the bowling team using the same two bowlers for the entire duration of a Test match.  When to deploy one's bowlers is a crucial part of the captain's role in real cricket, but is irrelevant in armchair cricket.

Dedicated deck card games